30 Days in China, is an upcoming Chinese–Nigerian comedy film co-produced by Corporate Entertainment World and FilmOne Entertainmen along with Chinese HuaHua Media. It is the first-ever China-Nigeria film in the world.

Initially Makun, who is a renowned Nollywood comedian, actor, and film producer, visited China and had discussions with executives of Huawen Movie group. During this visit, Makun met Wang, the chairman of Huahua Media and Moses Babatope of the Filmone Entertainment. They agreed to give financial and other local facilities needed for the film.

The film is the third installment of Makun’s comedy franchise, the sequel to 30 days in Atlanta and 10 days in Sun City.

Cast
 Ayodeji Richard Makun as Akpos

References

External links
 AY partners Chinese firm to produce new movie `30 days’
 AY announces plans to film ‘30 Days in China’ with Huawen Movie group
 China and Nollywood have signed up for their first major film collaboration

Nigerian comedy films
Chinese comedy films